The 2020 Scotties BC Women's Curling Championship, the provincial women's curling championship for British Columbia, was held from January 28 – February 2 at Western Financial Place in Cranbrook, British Columbia. The winning Corryn Brown rink represented British Columbia at the 2020 Scotties Tournament of Hearts in Moose Jaw, Saskatchewan and finished with a 5–6 record. The event was held in conjunction with the 2020 BC Men's Curling Championship, the provincial men's championship.

Corryn Brown won her first British Columbia Scotties Tournament of Hearts with a steal in the extra end to defeat the Sarah Wark rink.

Qualification process

Teams
The teams are listed as follows:

Round-robin standings
Final round-robin standings

Round-robin results
All draws are listed in Mountain Time (UTC−07:00).

Draw 1
Tuesday, January 28, 9:00 am

Draw 2
Tuesday, January 28, 2:00 pm

Draw 3
Tuesday, January 28, 7:00 pm

Draw 5
Wednesday, January 29, 12:00 pm

Draw 7
Wednesday, January 29, 8:00 pm

Draw 9
Thursday, January 30, 12:00 pm

Draw 10
Thursday, January 30, 4:00 pm

Draw 11
Thursday, January 30, 8:00 pm

Draw 12
Friday, January 31, 9:00 am

Draw 13
Friday, January 31, 2:00 pm

Playoffs

1 vs. 2
Saturday, February 1, 2:00 pm

3 vs. 4
Saturday, February 1, 2:00 pm

Semifinal
Saturday, February 1, 7:00 pm

Final
Sunday, February 2, 10:00 am

Qualification

Open #1
December 13–15, Abbotsford Curling Club, Abbotsford

Open #2
January 4–5, Enderby Curling Club, Enderby

References

External links

Scotties Tournament of Hearts
Curling in British Columbia
2020 Scotties Tournament of Hearts
January 2020 sports events in Canada
Cranbrook, British Columbia